The minister of international trade, export promotion, small business and economic development is a minister of the Crown in the Canadian Cabinet. The officeholder is one of four ministers who are associated with Innovation, Science and Economic Development Canada, and one of three ministers associated with Global Affairs Canada.

History 
Prior to the 2019 Canadian federal election, the minister of international trade was a separate ministerial position.

Before 2015, the Cabinet position responsible for small business was filled by either a Minister of State or Secretary of State. On November 4, 2015, upon the formation of the 29th Canadian Ministry, the position was named "Minister of Small Business and Tourism" without "of State" but remained formally a Minister of State "to assist the Minister of Industry" (the senior portfolio now styled as the Minister of Innovation, Science and Economic Development).

Economic development was added to the title of the portfolio after a Cabinet shuffle following the 2021 federal election.

List of ministers
Key:

Minister of State (Tourism)
From 1984 to 1986, the responsibilities for tourism were given to a Minister of State separate from the Minister of State (Small Business):

Minister of International Trade Diversification
Prior to the 2019 federal election, the Minister of International Trade and later the Minister of International Trade Diversification was a longstanding Canadian ministerial position.

References

External links
Department of Industry Canada

Small Business, Export Promotion, and International Trade
Canada, Small_Business,_Export_Promotion_and_International_Trade
Canada, Small_Business,_Export_Promotion_and_International_Trade
Canada, Small_Business,_Export_Promotion_and_International_Trade
 
Global Affairs Canada